Chak No 500 GB is a village of city Faisalabad Pakistan. It is situated near the bank of a canal. The area around the village produces vegetables and many other foods. The distance of city Sahiwal is 32 km, distance of Faisalabad is 90 km and distance of Lahore using M3 motorway (Pakistan) is 190 km.

There is Bangla Chowk where from five roads lead named Kamalia road, Tandlianwala road, Muridwala road, Kilianwala-Sahiwal road and Bullay Shah  River Ravi Road.

Education 
In Chak No 500 GB there are two schools. They include:

 Govt. Middle School for Girls Chak 500 GB
 Govt. Primary School for boys Chak 500 GB

Agriculture
Commons crops in this area are watermelon of near Ravi River, sugarcane, wheat, corn, and rice.

References

Villages in Faisalabad District